Black Label is the second EP by Australian nu metal band Ocean Grove released independently on 12 June 2015. It was later re-released through UNFD under the revised title Black Label (Sublime Vol.) on 27 April 2016 with the additional track "Lights On Kind of Lover".

Critical reception

Alex Sievers of KillYourStereo was positive about the EP, giving it a score of 90 (out of 100) and stating "From ‘Backbone’ to ‘167 Damillia’, this EP is gold the whole way through", and praised the band for evolving their sound when compared to their "underwhelming" debut EP Outsider, stating "Unlike their last EP, there is no filler, nor are there any weak links holding down the pack for us hungry critics to surround and devour. Each track is just as good as the track before it and its predecessor".

Track listing

Personnel
 Luke Holmes – lead vocals
 Dale Tanner – bass, vocals
 Matthew Henley – guitars
 Jimmy Hall – guitars
 Sam Bassal – drums, production, engineered, mastering, mixing
 Matthew Kopp – samples, keyboards

Charts

References 

2015 EPs
Ocean Grove (Australian band) albums
Nu metal EPs
Hardcore punk EPs